Slate Mountain Presbyterian Church and Cemetery is a historic Presbyterian church and cemetery in Patrick County, Virginia. It was built in 1932, and is one of six "rock churches" founded by Bob Childress and built between 1919 and the early 1950s.  The building consists of a one-story, gable-fronted rectangular form with a roughly square, Gothic Revival bell tower centered on the building's front elevation.  The building was erected on a concrete block foundation, and has walls of light wood framing covered with a thick quartz and quartzite fieldstone exterior veneer.

It was listed on the National Register of Historic Places in 2007.

See also
 Bluemont Presbyterian Church and Cemetery
 Buffalo Mountain Presbyterian Church and Cemetery
 Dinwiddie Presbyterian Church and Cemetery
 Mayberry Presbyterian Church
 Willis Presbyterian Church and Cemetery

References

External links
 Stone Churches of Reverend Bob Childress
 

Cemeteries in Patrick County, Virginia
Gothic Revival church buildings in Virginia
Stone churches in Virginia
Churches completed in 1932
Buildings and structures in Patrick County, Virginia
Protestant Reformed cemeteries
Churches on the National Register of Historic Places in Virginia
Presbyterian churches in Virginia
National Register of Historic Places in Patrick County, Virginia